In Greek mythology, Peratus (Ancient Greek: Πέρατος means "wanderer, emigrant"), also called  Eratus (Ἔρατος means "lovely"), was the 10th king of Sicyon who reigned for 46 years.

Family 
Peratus was the son of the sea-god Poseidon and Calchinia, daughter of King Leucippus. He was father of Plemnaeus who succeeded him to the throne of Aegialea (former name of Sicyon).

Mythology 
Peratus' grandfather, King Leucippus, brought him up and at the latter's death handed over the kingdom to him. However, in some accounts, the crown of Sicyon was passed to  Messapus before being inherited by Eratus .

Notes

References 

 Pausanias, Description of Greece with an English Translation by W.H.S. Jones, Litt.D., and H.A. Ormerod, M.A., in 4 Volumes. Cambridge, MA, Harvard University Press; London, William Heinemann Ltd. 1918. . Online version at the Perseus Digital Library
 Pausanias, Graeciae Descriptio. 3 vols. Leipzig, Teubner. 1903.  Greek text available at the Perseus Digital Library.

Children of Poseidon
Demigods in classical mythology
Mythological kings of Sicyon
Kings in Greek mythology
Sicyonian characters in Greek mythology